The Italian Athletics Federation (Italian: Federazione Italiana di Atletica Leggera, FIDAL), is the governing body for athletics in Italy since 1906.

The Italian Federation, founded on 21 October 1906, on initiative of La Gazzetta dello Sport, as Federazione Podistica Italiana (FPI), has been recognised by International Amateur Athletic Federation (IAAF), now World Athletics, since its Berlin Congress in 1913.

History
FIDAL assumed its current name in 1926, previously it was as described in the following table.

Presidents

Technical Directors
Since 1920 the technical directors of the Italian national team have been the following.

See also
Italy national athletics team
Athletics in Italy
FIDAL Hall of Fame
Naturalized athletes of Italy

References

External links 

Italy
Athletics in Italy
Athletics
National governing bodies for athletics
Sports organizations established in 1913
1906 establishments in Italy